Synalpheus is a genus of snapping shrimp of the family Alpheidae, presently containing more than 100 species; new ones are described on a regular basis, and the exact number even of described species is disputed.

Zuzalpheus
The genus Zuzalpheus was established for S. gambarelloides, S. brooksi, and their closest relatives, which contain several notably eusocial species. While these do seem to form a clade, it is not fully resolved whether or not they are indeed the sister taxon of all the remaining Synalpheus.

However, a detailed cladistic study of morphological characters found well marked differences between the proposed two genera and concluded that the supposed species groups around S. biunguiculatus/S. coutierei, S. brevicarpus and S. neomeris are neither clearly defined nor, as it seems, monophyletic, while the group separated in Zuzalpheus was clearly distinct in characters of the minor first walking legs (pereiopods), and usually distinct in some others; in all Synalpheus sensu stricto checked to date, the transverse setal comb on the back of the minor first pereopod dactyl is missing, and the carpus is plump (about as wide as it is long or slightly wider) and small (not longer than half the length of the palm).

Moreover, their stylocerite clearly extends beyond the whole first segment of the first antennae, their scaphocerite blade is never missing, the fixed finger of the major first pereopod is about the same length as the dactyl and the uropodal exopod always has one tooth only; these traits however may be also present in some of the species separated in Zuzalpheus though as far as can be told, most of these differ. While the authors of the 2008 analysis made no explicit comment on the status of the newly proposed genus, they thus found the S. gambarelloides species group to be well-marked, and their results certainly harden the case for recognition of Zuzalpheus at least as a subgenus.  However, this analysis only included 2 species from the S. gambarelloides species group, and none from the Caribbean, where the vast majority of the group resides.  Opinion is still divided, however, and recently Zuzalpheus was synonymised with Synalpheus.

Distribution
In the narrower sense, Synalpheus occur in the East Pacific where they are most plentiful and probably originated, and to a lesser extent in the Atlantic and the Indian Ocean; the species placed in Zuzalpheus occur mainly in the western Atlantic where their lineage probably originated, and to a lesser extent in the eastern Atlantic and Indian Ocean, and the East Pacific. It may thus be that the closure of the Isthmus of Panama in the Piacenzian (about 3 million years ago) was a key factor in separating the two lineages, as species referred to Synalpheus sensu stricto are most plentiful in the western Pacific.

Snapping
The snapping behaviour of Synalpheus is rather well studied. In Synalpheus parneomeris, peak to peak source levels of 185–190 dB re 1 μPa at 1 m were measured, depending on the size of the claw.

Eusociality
The only known eusocial aquatic species occur within the genus Synalpheus. The species known to be eusocial are S. brooksi, S. chacei, S. elizabethae, S. filidigitus, S. rathbunae, S. regalis, S. microneptunus, and S. duffyi as well as potentially S. riosi. Eusociality has evolved at least three times within Synalpheus. It appears that there were multiple rapid radiations between 3 and 9 mya from which the ancestors of these eusocial species appeared. Eusociality is thought to have arisen due to competition for space, because among the species that host Synalpheus, empty sponges are rarely found. It also appears that kin selection was necessary for this evolution to occur because the only species in which eusociality has appeared are non-dispersing shrimp that hatch directly into crawling individuals. Until recently, eusocial species of Synalpheus have appeared in far greater abundance than and appear to outcompete less social species for space in sponges.

Species
Synalpheus contains the following species:

Synalpheus agelas Pequegnat & Heard, 1979
Synalpheus albatrossi Coutière, 1909
Synalpheus amabilis De Man, 1910
Synalpheus anasimus Chace, 1972
Synalpheus anceps Banner, 1956
Synalpheus ancistrorhynchus De Man, 1909
Synalpheus androsi Coutière, 1909
Synalpheus antenor De Man, 1910
Synalpheus arostris Wicksten, 1989
Synalpheus bannerorum Abele, 1975
Synalpheus barahonensis Armstrong, 1949
Synalpheus belizensis Anker & Tóth, 2008
Synalpheus bispinosus De Man, 1910
Synalpheus bituberculatus De Man, 1910
Synalpheus biunguiculatus (Stimpson, 1860)
Synalpheus bocas Anker & Tóth, 2008
Synalpheus bousfieldi Chace, 1972
Synalpheus bradleyi Verrill, 1922
Synalpheus brevicarpus (Herrick, 1891)
Synalpheus brevidactylus Anker & Tóth, 2008
Synalpheus brevifrons Chace, 1972
Synalpheus brevispinis Coutière, 1909
Synalpheus brooksi Coutière, 1909
Synalpheus carinatus (De Man, 1888)
Synalpheus carpenteri MacDonald & Duffy, 2006
Synalpheus chacei Duffy, 1998
Synalpheus charon (Heller, 1861)
Synalpheus comatularum (Haswell, 1882)
Synalpheus corallinus MacDonald, Hultgren & Duffy, 2009
Synalpheus coutierei Banner, 1953
Synalpheus cretoculatus Banner & Banner, 1979
Synalpheus crosnieri Banner & Banner, 1983
Synalpheus curacaoensis Schmitt, 1924
Synalpheus dardeaui (Ríos & Duffy, 2007)
Synalpheus demani Borradaile, 1900
Synalpheus digueti Coutière, 1909
Synalpheus disparodigitus Armstrong, 1949
Synalpheus dominicensis Armstrong, 1949
Synalpheus dorae Bruce, 1988
Synalpheus duffyi Anker & Tóth, 2008
Synalpheus echinus Banner & Banner, 1975
Synalpheus elizabethae (Ríos & Duffy, 2007)
Synalpheus filidigitus Armstrong, 1949
Synalpheus fossor (Paul'son, 1875)
Synalpheus fritzmuelleri Coutière, 1909
Synalpheus gambarelloides (Nardo, 1847)
Synalpheus goodei Coutière, 1909
Synalpheus gracilirostris De Man, 1910
Synalpheus haddoni Coutière, 1900
Synalpheus harpagatrus Banner & Banner, 1975
Synalpheus hastilicrassus Coutière, 1905
Synalpheus heardi Dardeau, 1984
Synalpheus hemphilli Coutière, 1909
Synalpheus herdmaniae Lebour, 1938
Synalpheus heroni Coutière, 1909
Synalpheus herricki Coutière, 1909
Synalpheus hilarulus De Man, 1910
Synalpheus hoetjesi Hultgren, MacDonald & Duffy, 2010
Synalpheus idios (Ríos & Duffy, 2007)
Synalpheus iocasta De Man, 1909
Synalpheus iphinoe De Man, 1909
Synalpheus irie MacDonald, Hultgren & Duffy, 2009
Synalpheus jedanensis De Man, 1909
Synalpheus kensleyi (Ríos & Duffy, 2007)
Synalpheus kuadramanus Hultgren, MacDonald & Duffy, 2010
Synalpheus kusaiensis Kubo, 1940
Synalpheus laevimanus
Synalpheus lani Hermoso & Alvarez, 2005
Synalpheus laticeps Coutière, 1905
Synalpheus lockingtoni Coutière, 1909
Synalpheus longicarpus (Herrick, 1891)
Synalpheus lophodactylus Coutière, 1908
Synalpheus macromanus Edmondson, 1925
Synalpheus mcclendoni Coutière, 1910
Synalpheus merospiniger Coutière, 1908
Synalpheus mexicanus Coutière, 1909
Synalpheus microneptunus Hultgren, MacDonald & Duffy, 2011
Synalpheus minus (Say, 1818)
Synalpheus modestus De Man, 1909
Synalpheus mortenseni Banner & Banner, 1985
Synalpheus mulegensis Ríos, 1992
Synalpheus mushaensis Coutière, 1908
Synalpheus neomeris (De Man, 1897)
Synalpheus nilandensis Coutière, 1905
Synalpheus nobilii Coutière, 1909
Synalpheus obtusifrons Chace, 1972
Synalpheus occidentalis Coutière, 1909
Synalpheus odontophorus De Man, 1909
Synalpheus orapilosus Hultgren, MacDonald & Duffy, 2010
Synalpheus osburni Schmitt, 1933
Synalpheus otiosus Coutière, 1908
Synalpheus pachymeris Coutière, 1905
Synalpheus pandionis Coutière, 1909
Synalpheus paradoxus Banner & Banner, 1981
Synalpheus paralaticeps Banner & Banner, 1982
Synalpheus paraneomeris Coutière, 1905
Synalpheus paraneptunus Coutière, 1909
Synalpheus parfaiti (Coutière, 1898)
Synalpheus paulsonoides Coutière, 1909
Synalpheus pectiniger Coutière, 1907
Synalpheus peruvianus Rathbun, 1910
Synalpheus pescadorensis Coutière, 1905
Synalpheus pinkfloydi De Grave, 2017
Synalpheus plumosetosus MacDonald, Hultgren & Duffy, 2009
Synalpheus pococki Coutière, 1898
Synalpheus quadriarticulatus Banner & Banner, 1975
Synalpheus quadrispinosus De Man, 1910
Synalpheus quinquedens Tattersall, 1921
Synalpheus rathbunae Coutière, 1909
Synalpheus readi Banner & Banner, 1972
Synalpheus recessus Abele & W. Kim, 1989
Synalpheus redactocarpus Banner, 1953
Synalpheus regalis Duffy, 1996
Synalpheus riosi Anker & Tóth, 2008
Synalpheus ruetzleri MacDonald & Duffy, 2006
Synalpheus sanctithomae Coutière, 1909
Synalpheus sanjosei Coutière, 1909
Synalpheus sanlucasi Coutière, 1909
Synalpheus scaphoceris Coutière, 1910
Synalpheus sciro Banner & Banner, 1975
Synalpheus senegambiensis Coutière, 1908
Synalpheus septemspinosus De Man, 1910
Synalpheus sladeni Coutière, 1908
Synalpheus somalia Banner & Banner, 1979
Synalpheus spinifrons (H. Milne-Edwards, 1837)
Synalpheus spiniger (Stimpson, 1860)
Synalpheus spongicola Banner & Banner, 1981
Synalpheus stimpsonii (De Man, 1888)
Synalpheus streptodactylus Coutière, 1905
Synalpheus stylopleuron Hermoso Salazar & Hendrickx, 2006
Synalpheus superus Abele & W. Kim, 1989
Synalpheus tenuispina Coutière, 1909
Synalpheus thai Banner & Banner, 1966
Synalpheus theano De Man, 1910
Synalpheus thele MacDonald, Hultgren & Duffy, 2009
Synalpheus tijou Banner & Banner, 1982
Synalpheus townsendi Coutière, 1909
Synalpheus triacanthus De Man, 1910
Synalpheus tricuspidatus (Heller, 1861)
Synalpheus tridentulatus (Dana, 1852)
Synalpheus trispinosus De Man, 1910
Synalpheus triunguiculatus (Paul'son, 1875)
Synalpheus tropidodactylus Banner & Banner, 1975
Synalpheus tuthilli Banner, 1959
Synalpheus ul (Ríos & Duffy, 2007)
Synalpheus wickstenae Hermoso Salazar & Hendrickx, 2006
Synalpheus williamsi Ríos & Duffy, 1999
Synalpheus yano (Ríos & Duffy, 2007)

References

Further reading

External links

Alpheidae
Decapod genera
Taxa named by Charles Spence Bate